The Neisserial Phage-associated Holin (NP-Holin) Family (TC# 1.E.22) is a family of small proteins, between 47–53 amino acyl residues in length, that exhibit a single N-terminal transmembrane segment (TMS).  Although annotated as phage proteins or holins, NP-Holin proteins are not yet functionally characterized, thus more research is needed to confirm holin activity. A representative list of proteins belonging to the NP-Holin family can be found in the Transporter Classification Database.

See also 
 Holin
 Lysin
 Transporter Classification Database

Further reading

References 

Protein families
Membrane proteins
Transmembrane proteins
Transmembrane transporters
Transport proteins
Integral membrane proteins
Holins